IGSP may refer to:
Influenza Genome Sequencing Project, a project seeking investigate influenza evolution
Duke University Institute for Genome Sciences and Policy, an institution at Duke University